Harvestella is a 2022 role-playing video game developed by Live Wire and published by Square Enix. It was released for the Nintendo Switch and Windows on November 4. It has been compared to Final Fantasy and Rune Factory, and revolves around farming crops while attempting to save the world from the sudden appearance of a deadly magical plague known as Quietus.

Gameplay 
The game includes action RPG combat, with the player being able to choose one of twelve classes, including Fighter, Mage and Shadow Walker. Other gameplay aspects include life simulation elements, where players can explore their village and talk to its residents, farming, cooking, crafting and fishing. Besides the main story, each of the main characters have ten missions that the player must complete to strengthen their relationship with them, but they don't have to be done right away. There are also side missions that the player can do anytime. Both the character and side missions can be done by talking to a character with a symbol above them. The missions will not continue until the player receives letters from the characters, requesting them to come see them. They can also be done even after the main story is finished. Should the player successfully bond with one of the main characters, it could result in a marriage. During combat, players can have up to two of the main characters to help them in battle. Some characters may leave the party temporally. The game also has multiple endings, all of which are bad endings except one, which is the true ending.

Plot 
The game takes place in a world where four giant crystals are the most notable scenic points. These are called Seaslight and ensure a stable change between the four seasons. This is disrupted when Quietus causes crops to wither and die across the land and prevents people from going outside.

There are also characters that will aid the protagonist (who is defaultly named Ein): Shrika, a missionary; Heine, a flirtatious and handsome mechanic; Emo, a siren princess and the last of her kind; Cres, a doctor (she does not really travel with the player); Istina, a teacher who was once an assassin; Asyl, a spearman; Brakka, a mercenary; Aria, a mysterious girl who is believed to be from the future; Dianthus, one of the Omens who are believed to be responsible for Quietus; and an arrogant Unicorn.

The world has five towns, including Lethe, Nemea, Argene, and Shatolla.

Reception 

Harvestella received "mixed or average" reviews according to the review aggregator Metacritic. Jonathan Bolding of PC Gamer called the game "Square Enix's answer to Rune Factory", saying that it had a "distinctive spin and visual style". Cass Marshall of Polygon called it "an intriguing take on a chill vibes genre of game", and calling its fully 3D graphics an "interesting perspective". Ali Jones of GamesRadar+ called its $60 release price expensive compared to other farming sims, saying that "we'll have to wait [...] to see whether Harvestella proves worthy of its premium price".

References 

2022 video games
Fantasy video games
Farms in fiction
Japanese role-playing video games
Life simulation games
Nintendo Switch games
Single-player video games
Square Enix games
Unreal Engine games
Video games about amnesia
Video games featuring protagonists of selectable gender
Video games with alternate endings
Windows games